Sergio Junior Alcántara Hernández (born July 10, 1996) is a Dominican professional baseball infielder in the Chicago Cubs organization. He has played in Major League Baseball (MLB) for the Cubs, Detroit Tigers, Arizona Diamondbacks, and San Diego Padres.

Career

Arizona Diamondbacks
Alcántara signed with the Arizona Diamondbacks as an international free agent in July 2012 for a $700,000 signing bonus. He made his professional debut in 2013 with the AZL Diamondbacks and spent the whole season there, slashing .243/.398/.320 with 16 RBIs in 48 games. In 2014, he played for the Missoula Osprey where he batted .244 with one home run and 18 RBIs in 70 games, and in 2015, he played for the Kane County Cougars and Hillsboro Hops where he posted a combined .223 batting average with one home run and 28 RBIs in 91 total games between the two teams. He spent 2016 with the AZL Diamondbacks, Hillsboro, Kane County and the Visalia Rawhide, compiling a .284 batting average with one home run and 26 RBIs in 76 total games. He began 2017 back with Visalia.

Detroit Tigers
On July 18, 2017 the Diamondbacks traded Alcántara along with Dawel Lugo and Jose King to the Detroit Tigers for J. D. Martinez. Detroit assigned him to the Lakeland Flying Tigers and he finished the season there. In 121 total games between Visalia and Lakeland, he slashed .266/.334/.339 with three home runs, 35 RBIs, and a .673 OPS.

The Tigers added Alcántara to their 40-man roster after the 2017 season. In 2018, he spent the full season with the Double-A Erie SeaWolves, where he hit .271 with a home run, 37 RBIs, and eighteen doubles. For the second straight season, Alcantara would remain at the Double-A level for the full season during the 2019 season. Playing in 102 games (18 fewer than in 2018) he finished the season with a .247 average and .346 OBP. He hit two home runs, had 27 RBIs, but walked 48 times, six times more than in 2018. Alcántara was invited to spring training for the 2020 season but it was cut short due to the COVID-19 pandemic. When the league started but up in the summer, Alcántara missed the beginning of summer camp when he tested positive for COVID-19.

On September 4, 2020, the Tigers called up Alcántara as the 29th man for a doubleheader against the Minnesota Twins but was sent back down to the alternate training site afterwards without getting a chance to play. He was called up again the next day and made his major league debut on September 6. Alcántara hit a home run in his first at-bat with the Tigers, becoming the eighth Tiger player to accomplish this feat, and the first position player for the Tigers to do since Reggie Sanders in 1974. Overall with the 2020 Detroit Tigers, Alcántara batted .143 with one home run and 1 RBI in 10 games.

On January 29, 2021, Alcántara was designated for assignment by the Tigers following the signing of Wilson Ramos.

Chicago Cubs 
On February 5, 2021, Alcántara was claimed by the Chicago Cubs off waivers from the Tigers. On February 18, 2021, Alcántara was designated for assignment after the signing of Brandon Workman was made official. On February 20, Alcántara was outrighted and invited to Spring Training as a non-roster invitee. On May 30, Alcántara was selected to the active roster. He was designated for assignment on March 23, 2022, to make room on the roster for Mychal Givens.

Arizona Diamondbacks (second stint)
On March 27, 2022, Alcántara was traded to the Arizona Diamondbacks in exchange for cash considerations. He was named to Arizona's opening day roster on April 7. He was designated for assignment on May 6.

San Diego Padres 
On May 9, 2022, the San Diego Padres claimed him off waivers from the Diamondbacks. He was designated for assignment on June 30.

Arizona Diamondbacks (third stint)
On July 5, 2022, the Arizona Diamondbacks claimed him off waivers from the Padres. He elected free agency on November 10, 2022.

Chicago Cubs (second stint)
On December 20, 2022, Alcantara signed a minor league deal with the Chicago Cubs.

References

External links

1996 births
Living people
Arizona Diamondbacks players
Arizona League Diamondbacks players
Chicago Cubs players
Detroit Tigers players
Erie SeaWolves players
Hillsboro Hops players
Kane County Cougars players
Lakeland Flying Tigers players
Major League Baseball infielders
Major League Baseball players from the Dominican Republic
Missoula Osprey players
San Diego Padres players
Sportspeople from Santo Domingo
Tigres del Licey players
Visalia Rawhide players